Colonel Nicholas Greenberry (circa 1627December 17, 1697) was the 4th Royal Governor of Maryland, and Commander of the Military Forces of Anne Arundel and Baltimore Counties.

Early life and family
Nicholas Greenberry was born in about 1627 to unknown parents.  One possibility proposed by Charles Francis Stein, who studied the seal that Nicholas Greenberry used:

There is also a Nicholas Greenberry who was baptised in 1640 at Irnham, South Kesteven, Lincolnshire, England.  This Nicholas was the son of Nicholas and Catherine Greeneberrie née Hawkins of Irnham, Lincolnshire, England.

A Nicholas Greenberry also shows up in the state papers of Charles II:

Sometime between 1666 and 1671, Nicholas Greenberry married Anne (surname unknown).  Nicholas and Anne Greenberry had at least four children, two born in England: Charles, born in 1672 at Holburn, London, Middlesex, England and Katherine, born in 1674 at Holburn, London, Middlesex, England, and two born in Maryland: Anne, born in 1676 and Elizabeth, born in 1678.  English burial records show two children of a Nicholas Greenberry were buried in England between 1667 and 1671: Anne, buried 6 Aug 1667 at St Giles, Goudhurst, Kent, England, and Elizabeth, buried 19 Mar 1671 at Hoborn, London, Middlesex, England.

Nicholas Greenberry arrived at Patuxent, in the Maryland Colony, aboard the sailing ship Constant Friendship in 1674.  He was accompanied by his wife, two children (Charles and Katherine), and three servants.  On 9 July 1674, Capt. William Wheatly, master, claimed rights due for transportation of 43 passengers on board, including "Mr Greenberry his wife & two Children."

Land ownership 

Later, in 1680, Nicholas bought another tract of land near "Providence" called "Fuller" from Colonel William Fuller. This land was resurveyed and renamed "Greenberry Forest." Greenberry called the home "Whitehall," a name it retains to this day. In later years, this home became the residence of Horatio Sharpe, governor of the Maryland Colony. Sharpe had a Georgian mansion built on the site.

In 1685, Colonel Nicholas Greenberry bought 250 acres (1 km2) of land called "Towne Neck." This is located at the mouth of the Severn River and became known as "Greenberry Point." The colony's Deputy Governor, Governor Notley, was forced from office for hanging two Protestants for rebellion against authority. He was replaced by a committee of twenty citizens. Greenberry was one of the gentlemen justices chosen as a member of that committee.

Revolt 

On July 27, 1689, the Protestant Association, under John Coode, seized St. Marys, the capital of the colony, in a revolt against the proprietary government. This same year, Nicholas was captain of foot in the Anne Arundel County Militia. He was promoted to Major in 1690. He then quickly received a commission of Colonel, and was appointed Commander of the Military Forces of Anne Arundel and Baltimore Counties.

The proprietaryship was disallowed on June 27, 1691. Sir Lionel Copley took the office as governor, and quickly appointed Greenberry as a member of the council. Copley died in September 1693, at which time Greenberry was appointed by Sir Edmund Andros, Governor of Virginia, as President of the Council, Acting Governor of Maryland, and Keeper of the Great Seal of Maryland. Greenberry served in this capacity until he was replaced on July 26, 1694, by Francis Nicholson by a commission from the King dated in February 1694.

High court appointment 

On 2 March 1695, Nicholas Greenberry was on the high Court of Chancery of Maryland. Here is the way it reads verbatim:

Death 

Nicholas Greenberry died at the age of 70 on December 17, 1697, at Whitehall. His wife Anne died April 27, 1698, at the age of 50. Both are buried in St. Anne's Episcopal Church Cemetery, Annapolis, Maryland.

The inscription on Nicholas' tombstone reads:

Nicholas Greenberry's will mentions his wife Ann and his four children, Charles, Katherine, Anne, and Elizabeth.

References

Colonial Governors of Maryland
1627 births
1697 deaths
Burials in Maryland
People from Lincolnshire
English emigrants